is a Japanese light novel series written by Natsu Hyūga and illustrated by Touko Shino. It was serialized online since 2011 on the user-generated novel publishing website Shōsetsuka ni Narō. In the following year, it was acquired by Shufunotomo, who initially published the series as a novel with a single volume in 2012, and then as a light novel series in 2014. The series is set in a fictional country modelled after ancient China.

It has been adapted into two manga series in 2017, with one published by Square Enix in Monthly Big Gangan, and another one published by Shogakukan in Monthly Sunday Gene-X. The light novel is licensed in North America by J-Novel Club, and the manga illustrated by Nekokurage is licensed by Square Enix. An anime television series adaptation by Toho Animation Studio and OLM is set to premiere in 2023.

Premise
In a certain country in the East, Maomao, a young girl who works as a pharmacist in the red-light district, is kidnapped and sold to the imperial palace as a servant. However, she still retains her curious and eccentric personality and plans to work there until her years of servitude are over, without drawing the attention of anyone. One day, after hearing the rumors that the emperor's children are critically ill, she begins to investigate the cause, using her experience as a pharmacist, and successfully solves the mystery of their illness. Even though she intends to remain anonymous, her actions eventually catch the attention of an influential eunuch, and soon finds herself solving various mysteries in the imperial court.

Characters

Media

Novel
Originally, the series was only published by Natsu Hyūga on the user-generated web novel site Shōsetsuka ni Narō in October 2011. The publisher Shufunotomo acquired the series and then published it on their Ray Books imprint as a novel with a single volume on September 26, 2012.

Light novel
In 2014, Shufunotomo began to publish the series again. This time, it was published as a light novel in their Hero Bunko imprint, which is mostly made of acquired Shōsetsuka ni Narō titles. Since then, the series continued to get more volumes with the story continuing, unlike the previous novel version which had just only one volume. J-Novel Club announced in November 2020 that it had licensed the light novel series.

Volume list

Manga
A manga adaptation by Itsuki Nanao and illustrated by Nekokurage began in the 2017 6th issue of Square Enix's Monthly Big Gangan, released on May 25, 2017. Square Enix has compiled its chapters into individual tankōbon volumes. The first volume was published on September 25, 2017. As of February 25, 2023, eleven volumes have been published.

In November 2019, Square Enix announced the English language release of the manga in North America under the title The Apothecary Diaries, and began publishing it in December 2020.

The manga is also licensed in Indonesia by M&C!.

An alternative manga adaptation, titled , illustrated by Minoji Kurata, began in Shogakukan's Monthly Sunday Gene-X on August 19, 2017. Shogakukan has compiled its chapters into individual tankōbon volumes. The first volume was published on February 19, 2018. As of February 25, 2023, sixteen volume have been published.

The Apothecary Diaries

Mao Mao no Kōkyū Nazotoki Techō

Anime
An anime television series adaptation was announced on February 16, 2023. It is produced by Toho Animation Studio and OLM, with Norihiro Naganuma directing and supervising the scripts, and Akinori Fudesaka serving as assistant director. Yukiko Nakatani will design the characters, and Satoru Kōsaki, Kevin Penkin, and Alisa Okehazama will compose the music. The series is set to premiere in 2023.

Reception

Sales
The Apothecary Diaries was the sixth best-selling light novel series in 2019, with 461,024 copies sold; the fifth best-selling light novel series in 2020, with 527,950 copies sold; and the third best-selling light novel series in 2021, with 496,626 copies sold.

Critical response
In her review of the first novel for Anime News Network, Rebecca Silverman gave it an overall grade of B, writing: "It's an enjoyable read, one that gets better as it goes on, and if its pacing is a little too fast, it makes up for it in the way the characters interact and the story unfolds", though she criticized it for lacking in mystery elements despite being of the mystery genre. Silverman also gave the second novel a B grade, describing it as being "still an engaging read" and writing: "Maomao is a wonderful, if at times abrasive, heroine who takes no garbage from anyone, and watching her become more and more involved in the life of the court is interesting."

In his review of the first volume of the manga adaptation for Anime News Network, Theron Martin gave it an overall grade of B+. He praised the art, characters and use of historical details, and noted several similarities with The Story of Saiunkoku. Martin gave the second manga volume an overall grade of A−, writing: "The Apothecary Diaries manga adaptation continues to be an excellent read. The art is beautiful, Maomao's the sort of female character who's actually strong rather than just being a Strong Female Character, and the story has nice continuity."

In 2019, the manga adaptation won the Next Manga Award in the print category. The manga adaptation also ranked 5th on the "Nationwide Bookstore Employees' Recommended Comics of 2020". In 2020, it ranked 9th in the AnimeJapan Most Wanted Anime Adaptation poll.

References

External links
  at Shōsetsuka ni Narō 
  
  at Monthly Big Gangan 
  at Monthly Sunday Gene-X 
  at Square Enix Manga & Books
  
 

2012 Japanese novels
2014 Japanese novels
Anime and manga based on light novels
Comics set in a fictional country
Drama anime and manga
Gangan Comics manga
J-Novel Club books
Light novels
Light novels first published online
Mystery anime and manga
Novels set in fictional countries
OLM, Inc.
Romance anime and manga
Seinen manga
Shogakukan manga
Shōsetsuka ni Narō
Television series set in fictional countries
Toho Animation
Upcoming anime television series